Macintosh Latin is an obsolete character encoding which was used by Kermit (which as of 2022 supports Unicode UTF-8, though not UTF-16) to represent text on the Apple Macintosh (but not by standard Mac OS fonts). It is a modification of Mac OS Icelandic to include all characters in ISO/IEC 8859-1, DEC MCS, the PostScript Standard Encoding, and a Dutch ISO 646 variant (with ÿ or ij being a substitute for ĳ). Although Macintosh Latin is designed to be compatible with the standard Macintosh Mac OS Roman encoding for the shared subset of characters, the two should not be confused.

Layout
Each character is shown with its equivalent Unicode code point. Only the second half of the table (code points 128–255) is shown, the first half (code points 0–127) being the same as ASCII.

See also
 Macintosh Font X encoding, another Mac OS encoding used by Kermit

Footnotes

References

Character sets
Latin